Lochnaw Castle is a 16th-century tower house five miles from the town of Stranraer, in the historical county of Wigtownshire, Scotland. The spectacularly located "castle" incorporates a fortalice torhous. The "central" square tower 5 stories high formed part of the "New" Castle.   

Lochnaw Castle shows four periods of construction – a simple 16th-century keep, 17th- and 18th-century domestic dwellings, and a mansion-house, which was later demolished. There is a plaque bearing the date 1486, on the SE wall of the keep. A chapel, built in 1704, was demolished c. 1953.

An earlier, ruined castle stands on an island in the nearby Lochnaw Loch. A royal castle, this was given to the Agnews in 1363, but was sacked by Archibald The Grim, 3rd Earl of Douglas in 1390, and subsequently dismantled.

The Agnews remained in the new castle until 1948. The castle, located by the loch, is occupied as a private residence.

References

External links

Gazetteer for Scotland entry on Lochnaw Castle

Castles in Dumfries and Galloway
Category A listed buildings in Dumfries and Galloway
Clan Agnew
Listed castles in Scotland
Tower houses in Scotland
Rhins of Galloway